Bradford City Association Football Club's first manager was Robert Campbell, who was given the role upon the club's election into the league in 1903 although the club was administered by a 13-man sub-committee. He left by mutual consent in 1905 to be succeeded by the club's most successful manager Peter O'Rourke in the first of two periods in charge of the club. O'Rourke's first spell as manager lasted 16 years, during which time he oversaw the club's first title and promotion in 1907–08 and the FA Cup success of 1911. David Menzies took over in 1921, but the club were relegated the following year. The club continued to struggle and Menzies' successor Colin Veitch oversaw a second relegation in 1926–27 before O'Rourke returned to the club. During his second spell he brought the Division Three (North) title in 1928–29 when the club set a number of records which remain today. O'Rourke resigned in 1930 to be succeeded by first Jack Peart then Dick Ray but the club were again relegated in 1936–37.

For half-a-century, City remained in the bottom two divisions of the Football League under a succession of managers until the 1980s brought an upturn in the club's fortunes. Former England international Roy McFarland was appointed player-manager in 1981, bringing instant success with promotion from Division Four in 1981–82. But he left in controversial circumstances to Derby County, to be replaced by another England international Trevor Cherry as player-manager from rivals Leeds United. Cherry oversaw a turbulent period at the club, which included City going into liquidation in 1983, the Division Three title in 1984–85 and the tragic fire on 11 May 1985. He was only the third City manager to win a trophy.

Cherry was sacked just one month after the club returned to Valley Parade in a move which shocked the Bradford public. His successor was first team coach Terry Dolan, who had played for the club for five years making nearly 200 league appearances. With the fans still singing Cherry's name, Dolan quickly won over the fans with a 5–1 FA Cup victory over Oldham Athletic in his first game, before guiding the club away from relegation and a 10th-place finish in 1986–87. The following season a final day defeat to Ipswich Town then failure in the play-offs against Middlesbrough prevented Dolan from taking the club into top flight for the first time in 66 years. He was unable to replace star players Stuart McCall and John Hendrie, who left during the summer, and was sacked to be replaced by Welsh manager Terry Yorath but relegation followed in 1989–90.

John Docherty had taken over two months before relegation was confirmed. During the 1990 close season he signed Sean McCarthy, to solve the club's goal-scoring problem, and a number of his former players from Millwall but he could not help City bounce back. He was replaced by Frank Stapleton, who also failed to deliver promotion before new chairman Geoffrey Richmond bought the club. Richmond's first appointment was experienced manager Lennie Lawrence, who had made a solid start to the 1995–96 season before he was enticed away to Luton Town. Richmond appointed assistant Chris Kamara, who took City to promotion via the play-offs following a run of results at the end of the season, taking 28 points from a possible 39 to edge Chesterfield out of the play-off places by just one point. A 2–0 victory in the final against Notts County meant City and Luton Town swapped divisions.

Kamara was also succeeded by his own assistant Paul Jewell originally on a temporary basis before the striker, who had been at the club since 1988, was given the job permanently in the summer of 1998. Richmond gave Jewell the biggest transfer budget in the club's history. Jewell signed the club's first three £1million players to mastermind Bradford's return to the top flight in his first full season. He then defied the critics by keeping the club in the Premiership with a 1–0 victory over the club where he had begun his career Liverpool. Jewell made a shock exit from the club after a disagreement with Richmond, who made his third successive appointment from within the club by elevating Chris Hutchings to the manager's seat. Hutchings was given unprecedented money for a Bradford manager to spend on a series of talented players including record signing David Hopkin, Benito Carbone and Dan Petrescu but he was sacked after 137 days and just one win from 12 league games.

The money Hutchings was given, combined with the collapse of ITV Digital continued to have repercussions on the club's league position and finances long after he had left. Three relegations have followed with a succession of respected managers, including Jim Jefferies, former England captain Bryan Robson and Colin Todd unable to stop the club from dropping through the league. Having stated in his autobiography he would one day "love to manage Bradford", Stuart McCall, who had two playing spells at the club, came from Sheffield United on 22 May 2007 to become the club's 38th full-time manager. McCall was given a two-year contract and promised to deliver promotion in his first season. He later changed his judgement and aimed at promotion in his second season; when he again failed he offered to resign, but stayed on for a third campaign. He left in February 2010, and was replaced by Peter Taylor. Taylor's reign lasted only a year before he resigned after criticism from fans, to be replaced by Peter Jackson. Jackson staved off relegation to the Football Conference, which was looking a possibility when Taylor resigned, but his reign proved to be even shorter-lived and he resigned after just six months in charge, with the lowest win percentage of any permanent manager in the club's history. Phil Parkinson succeeded Jackson and won another relegation battle, before bringing about a major revival in the club's fortunes the following year, taking the side to the final of the League Cup before winning promotion back to League One via the play-offs.

Managers

Only professional, competitive matches are counted.

Notes

References

 
Bradford City
Managers